The Great Lakes Intercollegiate Athletic Conference (GLIAC) is a competitive college athletic conference affiliated with the National Collegiate Athletic Association (NCAA) at the Division II level.

The GLIAC was founded in June 1972. Its eleven member institutions are located in the Midwestern United States in the states of Michigan, Indiana, and Wisconsin. There are three affiliate members who compete in the GLIAC for sports not sponsored by their home conference.

Sponsorship of football was dropped by the GLIAC after the 1989 season. Conference schools sponsoring football joined with members of the Heartland Football Conference to form the Midwest Intercollegiate Football Conference (MIFC), which began play in 1990. The MIFC merged with the GLIAC in July 1999, and the GLIAC resumed sponsorship of football that fall.

History

Chronological timeline
 1972: The Great Lakes Intercollegiate Athletic Conference (GLIAC) was founded in 1972. The charter members of the GLIAC were the following: Ferris State University, Grand Valley State University, Lake Superior State University, Northwood Institute (now Northwood University) and Saginaw Valley State University, effective beginning the 1972–1973 academic year.
 1974:
 Women's programs became part of the GLIAC, effective in the 1974–1975 academic year.
 Oakland University joined the GLIAC, effective in the 1974–1975 academic year.
 1975: Hillsdale College, Northern Michigan University and Wayne State University joined the GLIAC, effective in the 1975–1976 academic year.
 1977: Northern Michigan left the GLIAC, effective after the 1976–1977 academic year.
 1980: Michigan Technological University (Michigan Tech) joined the GLIAC, effective in the 1980–1981 academic year.
 1987:
 Northwood left the GLIAC, effective after the 1986–1987 academic year.
 Northern Michigan re-joined the GLIAC, effective in the 1987–1988 academic year.
 1989–1990: The GLIAC dropped football as a sponsored sport, effective after the 1989–1990 academic year.
 1992: Northwood re-joined the GLIAC, effective in the 1992–1993 academic year.
 1994: On December 14, 1994, Ashland University, Gannon University and Mercyhurst College (now Mercyhurst University) joined the GLIAC, effective in the 1995–1996 academic year.
 1997:
 Oakland left the GLIAC to become an Division I Independent (who would later join the Mid-Continent Conference, effective beginning the 1998–1999 academic year), effective after the 1996–1997 academic year.
 The University of Findlay joined the GLIAC, effective in the 1997–1998 academic year.
 1999: The GLIAC reinstated football as a sponsored sport by merging the Midwest Intercollegiate Football Conference (MIFC); while the University of Indianapolis (UIndy) became an affiliate member as a football-only school; both effective in the 1999 fall season (1999–2000 academic year).
 2001: Indianapolis added men's and women's swimming & diving to its GLIAC affiliate membership, effective in the 2001–2002 academic year.
 2004: Lewis University joined the GLIAC as an affiliate member for men's and women's swimming and diving, effective in the 2004–2005 academic year.
 2007: On June 20, 2007, Tiffin University joined the GLIAC, effective in the 2008–2009 academic year.
 2008: Gannon and Mercyhurst left the GLIAC to join the Pennsylvania State Athletic Conference (PSAC), effective after the 2007–2008 academic year.
 2010: Lake Erie College and Ohio Dominican University joined the GLIAC, effective in the 2010–2011 academic year.
 2012:
 Malone University and Walsh University joined the GLIAC, effective in the 2012–2013 academic year.
 Notre Dame College joined the GLIAC as an affiliate member for some sports (football, women's lacrosse, men's and women's soccer, and wrestling), effective in the 2012–2013 academic year.
 Alderson Broaddus University, Urbana University and Wheeling Jesuit University joined the GLIAC as affiliate members for women's lacrosse, effective in the 2013 spring season (2012–2013 academic year).
 2013:
 Notre Dame (OH) left the GLIAC as an affiliate member to move its sports into its new primary conference home in the Mountain East Conference, effective after the 2012–2013 academic year.
 UIndy and Lewis left the GLIAC as affiliate members for men's and women's swimming & diving, effective after the 2012–2013 academic year.
 Ursuline College joined the GLIAC as an affiliate member for women's lacrosse and women's swimming & diving, effective in the 2012–2013 academic year.
 2014:
 Urbana and Wheeling Jesuit left the GLIAC as affiliate members for women's lacrosse, effective after the 2014 spring season (2013–2014 academic year).
 McKendree University joined the GLIAC as an affiliate member for women's lacrosse, effective in the 2015 spring season (2014–2015 academic year).
 2015:
 Alderson Broaddus and Ursuline left the GLIAC as affiliate members for women's lacrosse, effective after the 2015 spring season (2014–2015 academic year).
 UIndy added women's lacrosse to its GLIAC affiliate membership, effective in the 2016 spring season (2015–2016 academic year).
 2016:
 Malone left the GLIAC to join the Great Midwest Athletic Conference (G-MAC), effective after the 2015–2016 academic year.
 Ursuline left the GLIAC as an affiliate member for women's swimming & diving, effective after the 2015–2016 academic year.
 2017:
 Findlay, Hillsdale, Lake Erie, Ohio Dominican and Walsh left the GLIAC to join the G-MAC, effective after the 2016–2017 academic year.
 Davenport University and Purdue University–Northwest joined the GLIAC, effective in the 2017–2018 academic year.
 Concordia University, St. Paul joined the GLIAC as an affiliate member for men's lacrosse, effective in the 2018 spring season (2017–2018 academic year).
 2018:
 Tiffin left the GLIAC to join the G-MAC, effective after the 2017–2018 academic year.
 The University of Wisconsin–Parkside joined the GLIAC, effective in the 2018–2019 academic year. It also adopted the new athletic brand name of Parkside.
 Three institutions joined the GLIAC as affiliate members: Lewis and Maryville University for women's lacrosse, and St. Cloud State University for men's swimming and men's swimming & diving, effective in the 2018–2019 academic year.
 2019:
 UIndy, Lewis, Maryville and McKendree left the GLIAC as affiliate members for women's lacrosse, effective after the 2019 spring season (2018–2019 academic year).
 Upper Iowa University joined the GLIAC as an affiliate member for men's soccer and women's lacrosse, effective in the 2019–2020 academic year.
 2021:
 Ashland left the GLIAC to join the G-MAC, effective after the 2020–2021 academic year.
 Augustana University joined the GLIAC as an affiliate member for men's swimming & diving, effective in the 2021–2022 academic year.
 2022:
 Northwood left the GLIAC for a second time to join the G-MAC, effective after the 2021–2022 academic year.
 Roosevelt University announced it would join the GLIAC, effective in the 2023–2024 academic year. Although Roosevelt will join the conference as a provisional member, it will continue to compete in the National Association of Intercollegiate Athletics (NAIA) and the Chicagoland Collegiate Athletic Conference (CCAC) in 2023–2024 before beginning competition as a full GLIAC member in July 2024.
 Upper Iowa announces its intent to move to the Great Lakes Valley Conference in all sports after the 2022–2023 academic year, including its GLIAC affiliated sports of women's lacrosse and men's soccer.

Member schools

Current members
The GLIAC currently has 10 full members; all but one are public schools:

Notes

Future members

Notes

Affiliate members
The GLIAC currently has four affiliate members, all but one are private schools:

Former members
The GLIAC had 13 former full members; all but one are private schools:

Notes

Former affiliate members
The GLIAC had nine former affiliate members, all were private schools. School names and nicknames reflect those in use in the final season each school was an affiliate:

Notes

Membership timeline
The GLIAC dropped football after the 1989 fall season (1989–1990 school year) and resumed it for the 1999 fall season (1999–2000 school year).

Sports
The GLIAC sponsors the following 21 sports:

Men's sponsored sports by school
Departing members in pink.

Women's sponsored sports by school
Departing members in pink.

Other sponsored sports by school

In addition to the above:
 Davenport has varsity teams in esports (coeducational) and the women-only cheerleading discipline of STUNT. It will add men's and women's varsity teams in the flying disc sport of ultimate in 2023–24.
 Michigan Tech and Purdue Northwest have coeducational varsity esports teams.
 Northern Michigan recognizes esports (fully coeducational) as a varsity sport. Also, the university hosts an official U.S. Olympic training center for men's and women's weightlifting; all participants in this program are enrolled at NMU, and are recognized as varsity athletes.

Championships

National Championships

GLIAC schools have won 49 NCAA National Championships:

Football facilities

References

External links